Lyon County is a county located in the U.S. state of Kentucky. As of the 2020 census, the population was 8,680. Its county seat is Eddyville. The county was formed from Caldwell County, Kentucky in 1854 and named for former Congressman Chittenden Lyon.

Geography 

Adjacent counties
 Crittenden County  (north)
 Caldwell County  (east)
 Trigg County  (south)
 Marshall County  (southwest)
 Livingston County  (northwest)

National protected area
 Land Between the Lakes National Recreation Area (part)

Demographics 

As of the census of 2000, there were 8,080 people, 2,898 households, and 2,043 families living in the county. The racial makeup of the county was 91.86% White, 6.72% Black or African American, 0.30% Native American, 0.17% Asian, 0.01% Pacific Islander, 0.40% from other races, and 0.54% from two or more races.  0.73% of the population were Hispanic or Latino of any race.

The largest ancestry groups in Lyon County, Kentucky according to the census of 2000 are:
 English - 21%
 Irish - 15%
 German - 12%
 African - 7%
 French - 4%
 Scottish - 2%
 Scots-Irish - 20%
 Dutch - 2%

There were 2,898 households, out of which 25.10% had children under the age of 18 living with them, 59.80% were married couples living together, 8.10% had a female householder with no husband present, and 29.50% were non-families. 26.80% of all households were made up of individuals, and 12.20% had someone living alone who was 65 years of age or older.  The average household size was 2.26 and the average family size was 2.70.

The age distribution was 15.80% under the age of 18, 7.50% from 18 to 24, 32.90% from 25 to 44, 27.00% from 45 to 64, and 16.80% who were 65 years of age or older.  The median age was 42 years. For every 100 females there were 133.50 males.  For every 100 females age 18 and over, there were 138.10 males.

The median income for a household in the county was $31,694, and the median income for a family was $39,940. Males had a median income of $36,034 versus $21,806 for females. The per capita income for the county was $16,016.  About 10.20% of families and 12.70% of the population were below the poverty line, including 17.30% of those under age 18 and 13.30% of those age 65 or over.

Communities

Cities
 Eddyville (county seat)
 Kuttawa

Unincorporated communities
 Carmack
 Confederate
 Lamasco
 Suwanee
 Twin Lakes

Notable residents
 Keen Johnson, publisher and Kentucky governor, born in Lyon County, 1896
 Hylan Benton Lyon, Confederate general and Kentucky political figure
 Forrest Pogue, World War II Historian, born in Lyon County, 1912

Politics

See also
 National Register of Historic Places listings in Lyon County, Kentucky

References

External links
 Local Information
 Lyon County School's student index
 Land Between the Lakes Homepage

 
Kentucky counties
1854 establishments in Kentucky
Populated places established in 1854